Merrill-Maley House is a historic mansion in Jackson, Mississippi, U.S..

History
The house was built in 1907 for Philip S. Merrill, the manager of the George B. Merrill & Sons Lumber Company. It was subsequently purchased by Charles E. Maley, a lumber. Later, it was purchased by Dr. W. F. Henderson and his wife, Lucille Henderson. In 1945, the house was remodelled into seven apartments.

The house has been listed on the National Register of Historic Places since April 29, 1982.

References

Houses on the National Register of Historic Places in Mississippi
Colonial Revival architecture in Mississippi
Houses completed in 1907
Houses in Jackson, Mississippi